Regina/Aerogate Aerodrome  is located  north of Regina, Saskatchewan, Canada.

See also 
 Regina International Airport
 Regina General Hospital Heliport
 List of airports in Saskatchewan

References 

Registered aerodromes in Saskatchewan
Transport in Regina, Saskatchewan